I Am What I Am is an album by American country music artist George Jones released in 1980 on Epic Records label. On July 4, 2000, the CD version was reissued with four previously unreleased bonus tracks on the Legacy Recordings label.

Recording and composition
By 1980, Jones had not had a number one single in six years and, dogged by no shows and substance abuse, many critics began to write him off. However, the singer stunned the music industry in April when "He Stopped Loving Her Today" was released and shot to number one on the country charts, remaining there for 18 weeks. The song was written by Bobby Braddock and Curly Putman and tells the story of a friend who has never given up on his love; he keeps old letters and photos from back in the day and hangs on to hope that she would "come back again". The song reaches its peak in the chorus, revealing that he indeed stopped loving her when he died and the woman does return—for his funeral. In a lesser singer's hands, the song might have sounded corny or even comical but Jones' interpretation, buoyed by his brilliant delivery of the line "...first time I'd seen him smile in years", gives it a mournful, gripping realism. When it began being played on the radio in the spring of 1980, just about everyone who heard it was floored. According to producer Billy Sherrill and Jones himself, the singer hated the song when he first heard it. In Bob Allen's biography of the singer, Sherrill states, "He thought it was too long, too sad, too depressing and that nobody would ever play it...He hated the melody and wouldn't learn it." Sherrill also claims that Jones frustrated him by continually singing the song to the melody of the Kris Kristofferson hit "Help Me Make It Through the Night". In the 1989 Same Ole Me retrospective, Sherrill recalls a heated exchange during one recording session: "I said 'That's not the melody!' and he said 'Yeah, but it's a better melody.' I said 'It might be—Kristofferson would think so too, it's his melody!'" In the same documentary, Sherrill claims that Jones was in such bad physical shape during this period that "the recitation was recorded 18 months after the first verse was" and added that the last words Jones said about "He Stopped Loving Her Today" was "Nobody'll buy that morbid son of a #####". A big part of Jones' success over the years was that he could always smell a hit but this time his instincts were woefully off. Although he had disliked "He Stopped Loving Her Today" when it was first offered to him, Jones ultimately gave the song credit for reviving his flagging career, stating that "a four-decade career had been salvaged by a three-minute song." It was more like a phenomenon than a song;  Jones earned the Grammy Award for Best Male Country Vocal Performance in 1980 and the Academy of Country Music awarded the song Single of the Year and Song of the Year in 1980. It also became the Country Music Association's Song of the Year in both 1980 and 1981.

Since 1975, the singer had scored only one top ten LP (1976's Alone Again) so Epic and Sherrill were quick to capitalize on the success of the single in 1980 by getting Jones in the studio to record some brand new songs.  As he had done in the early days of Jones's marriage to Tammy Wynette (and during the dark days following their divorce), the veteran producer cherry picked songs that sounded as if they were pages torn from the singer's life.  While Jones's recent albums with Sherrill had been accused of being erratic at times, I Am What I Am contained just about everything a fan could want from a George Jones record, including hard drinking songs like the self-explanatory "I've Aged Twenty Years In Five" and "If Drinkin' Don't Kill Me (Her Memory Will)", which rose to number 8 on the singles chart in 1981.  In his essay for the Sony reissue of the album, Glen Gass of the Indiana University School of Music calls "If Drinkin' Don't Kill Me" "a manifesto of existential barroom despair" that would have been a "tossed off novelty" in another singer's hands (During performances of the song, Jones would jokingly conclude it by replacing "her memory will" with "Tammy's memory will").  Another drinking song, the musically upbeat "Bone Dry", explores in hellish detail the withdrawal associated with alcohol addiction.  "Cheatin' songs" are also represented with the coy "I'm The One She Missed Him With Today" and the honky-tonk ballad "Brother To The Blues".   Jones forte had always been the ballad, of course, and his rendition of the Tom T. Hall composition "I'm Not Ready Yet", which like "He Stopped Loving Her Today" includes a recitation, peaked at number 2 on the charts.  The singer even got one of his own songs, "A Hard Act To Follow", on the album, which he wrote with Earl Montgomery, and finally recorded his own version of the country classic "Good Hearted Woman".

There was no information provided in the liner notes on the four bonus tracks added to the 2000 Legacy CD edition other than songwriting credits for three of the four songs, with "Am I Losing Your Memory or Mine?" credited to "writer unknown", and stating all four were "previously unreleased".  There was no mention of when these songs were originally recorded.

Reception
I Am What I Am peaked at number 7 on the Billboard country album charts, his first top 10 album in five years, and even appeared on the Billboard Top 200 at 132.  The phoenix-like reemergence of Jones only made the performances of the songs more captivating for listeners, as Glen Gass observed in 2000:  "I Am What I Am is music from the abyss.  The 1980 album was released at a time when George Jones seemed as likely to die than resurrect his career, after a personal disintegration that shocked even his most hardcore friends and fans."  Stephen Thomas Erlewine of AllMusic raves "the production is commercial without being slick, the songs are balanced between aching ballads and restrained honky tonk numbers, and Jones gives a nuanced, moving performance...like the best country music, these are lived-in songs that are simple, direct, and emotionally powerful, even with the smooth production."  Sputnikmusic calls the album "As raw as the cheapest whiskey, as pretty as the girl you can’t forget...George took his tenor, along with the mainstay Country music themes of drinking and heartbreak, and made the entire genre his own."  Amazon.com calls it "an unassailable classic of modern country music."

Track listing

Personnel
 George Jones – vocals
Billy Sanford – guitar
Pete Wade – guitar
Phil Baugh – guitar 
Pete Drake – pedal steel guitar
Henry Strzelecki – bass guitar
Jerry Carrigan – drums
Hargus "Pig" Robbins – piano
Charlie McCoy – harmonica
Bob Moore – upright bass
Bob Wray – bass guitar

Charts

Weekly charts

Year-end charts

Certifications

References

1980 albums
George Jones albums
Epic Records albums
Albums produced by Billy Sherrill